Canti is a surname. Notable people with the name include:

 Aldo Canti (born 1961), Olympic sprinter
 Alfonso Canti (1920–1996), Italian weightlifter
 Claudio Canti (born 1965), Sammarinese football defender
 Dominique Canti (born 1967), Sanmarinese sprinter
 Giovanni Canti (died 1716), Italian painter
 Ronald Canti (1883–1936) British bacteriologist

See also
Canty (surname)